Hanna Reitsch (29 March 1912 – 24 August 1979) was a German aviator and test pilot. Along with Melitta von Stauffenberg, she flight tested many of Germany's new aircraft during World War II and received many honors.

Reitsch set more than 40 flight altitude records and women's endurance records in gliding and unpowered flight, before and after World War II.  In the 1960s, she was sponsored by the West German foreign office as a technical adviser in Ghana and elsewhere, and founded a gliding school in Ghana, where she worked for Kwame Nkrumah.

Early life and education
Reitsch was born in Hirschberg, Silesia, on 29 March 1912 to an upper-middle-class family. She was daughter of Dr. Wilhelm (Willy) Reitsch, who was an ophthalmology clinic manager, and his wife Emy Helff-Hibler von Alpenheim, who was a member of the Austrian nobility. Despite her mother being a devout Catholic, Hanna was raised a Protestant. She had two siblings, her brother Kurt, a Frigate captain, and her younger sister Heidi. Reitsch began flight training in 1932 at the School of Gliding in Grunau. While a medical student in Berlin she enrolled in a German Air Mail amateur flying school for powered aircraft at Staaken, training in a Klemm Kl 25.

Career

1933–1937
In 1933, Reitsch left medical school at the University of Kiel to become, at the invitation of Wolf Hirth, a full-time glider pilot/instructor at Hornberg in Baden-Württemberg. Reitsch contracted with the Ufa Film Company as a stunt pilot and set an unofficial endurance record for women of 11 hours and 20 minutes.
In January 1934, she joined a South America expedition to study thermal conditions, along with Wolf Hirth, Peter Riedel and Heini Dittmar. While in Argentina, she became the first woman to earn the Silver C Badge, the 25th to do so among world glider pilots.

In June 1934, Reitsch became a member of the Deutsche Forschungsanstalt für Segelflug (DFS) and became a test pilot in 1935. Reitsch enrolled in the Civil Airways Training School in Stettin, where she flew a twin-engine on a cross country flight and aerobatics in a Focke-Wulf Fw 44.
In 1937, Ernst Udet gave Reitsch the honorary title of  after she had successfully tested Hans Jacobs's divebrakes for gliders.
At the DFS she test-flew transport and troop-carrying gliders, including the DFS 230 used at the Battle of Fort Eben-Emael.

1937–1945

In September 1937, Reitsch was posted to the Luftwaffe testing centre at Rechlin-Lärz Airfield by Ernst Udet.

Her flying skill, desire for publicity, and photogenic qualities made her a star of Nazi propaganda. Physically she was petite in stature, very slender with blonde hair, blue eyes and a "ready smile". She appeared in Nazi propaganda throughout the late 1930s and early 1940s.

Reitsch was the first female helicopter pilot and one of the few pilots to fly the Focke-Achgelis Fa 61, the first fully controllable helicopter, for which she received the Military Flying Medal.

In September 1938, Reitsch flew the DFS Habicht in the Cleveland National Air Races.

Reitsch was a test pilot on the Junkers Ju 87  dive bomber and Dornier Do 17 light/fast bomber projects, for which she received the Iron Cross, Second Class, from Hitler on 28 March 1941.
Reitsch was asked to fly many of Germany's latest designs, among them the rocket-propelled Messerschmitt Me 163  in 1942. A crash landing on her fifth Me 163 flight badly injured Reitsch; she spent five months in a hospital recovering. Reitsch received the Iron Cross First Class following the accident, one of only three women to do so.

In February 1943 after news of the defeat in the Battle of Stalingrad she accepted an invitation from Generaloberst Robert Ritter von Greim to visit the Eastern Front. She spent three weeks visiting Luftwaffe units, flying a Fieseler Fi 156 Storch.

V-1, 1944
On 28 February 1944, she presented the idea of Operation Suicide to Hitler at Berchtesgaden, which "would require men who were ready to sacrifice themselves in the conviction that only by this means could their country be saved." Although Hitler "did not consider the war situation sufficiently serious to warrant them ... and ... this was not the right psychological moment", he gave his approval. The project was assigned to Gen. Günther Korten. There were about seventy volunteers who enrolled in the Suicide Group as pilots for the human glider-bomb. By April 1944, Reitsch and Heinz Kensche finished tests of the Me 328, carried aloft by a Dornier Do 217. They adapted the V-1 flying bomb into the Fieseler Fi 103R Reichenberg including a two-seater and a single-seater with and without the mechanisms to land. The plan was never implemented operationally, "the decisive moment had been missed."

In her autobiography  Reitsch recalled that after two initial crashes with the Fi 103R she and Heinz Kensche took over tests of the prototype Fi 103R. She made several successful test flights before training the instructors. "Though an average pilot could fly the V1 without difficulty once it was in the air, to land it called for exceptional skill, in that it had a very high landing speed and, moreover, in training it was the glider model, without engine, that was usually employed."

In October 1944, Reitsch claims she was shown a booklet by Peter Riedel which he'd obtained while in the German Embassy in Stockholm, concerning the gas chambers. She further claims that while believing it to be enemy propaganda, she agreed to inform Heinrich Himmler about it. Upon doing so, Himmler is said to have asked whether she believed it, and she replied, "No, of course not. But you must do something to counter it. You can't let them shoulder this onto Germany." "You are right," Himmler replied.

Berlin, 1945

During the last days of the war, Hitler dismissed Hermann Göring as head of the Luftwaffe and appointed von Greim, to replace him. Reitsch and von Greim had flown from Rechlin–Lärz Airfield to Gatow Airfield in a Focke Wulf 190, escorted by twelve other Fw 190s from Jagdgeschwader 26 under the command of  Hans Dortenmann. In Berlin, Reitsch landed a Fi 156  on an improvised airstrip in the Tiergarten near the Brandenburg Gate. Hitler gave Reitsch two capsules of poison for herself and von Greim. She accepted the capsule.

Shortly after midnight on 29 April, Reitsch and von Greim flew out of Berlin in an Arado Ar 96 from the same improvised airstrip. This was the last plane out of Berlin. Von Greim was ordered to get the Luftwaffe to attack the Soviet forces that had just reached Potsdamer Platz and to make sure Heinrich Himmler was punished for his treachery in making unauthorised contact with the Western Allies so as to surrender. Troops of the Soviet 3rd Shock Army, which was fighting its way through the Tiergarten from the north, tried to shoot the plane down fearing that Hitler was escaping in it, but it took off successfully.

Capture, 1945
Reitsch was soon captured along with von Greim and the two were interviewed together by U.S. military intelligence officers. Reitsch also said: "We should all kneel down in reverence and prayer before the altar of the Fatherland." When the interviewers asked what she meant by "Altar of the Fatherland" she answered, "Why, the Führer's bunker in Berlin ..." She was held for eighteen months. Von Greim killed himself on 24 May 1945.

Evacuated from Silesia ahead of the Soviet troops, Reitsch's family took refuge in Salzburg. During  the night of 3 May 1945, after hearing a rumour that all refugees were to be taken back to their original homes in the Soviet occupation zone, Reitsch's father shot and killed her mother and sister and her sister's three children before killing himself.

1945–1979
After her release Reitsch settled in Frankfurt am Main. After the war, German citizens were barred from flying powered aircraft, but within a few years gliding was allowed, which she took up again. In 1952, Reitsch won a bronze medal in the World Gliding Championships in Spain; she was the first woman to compete and in 1955 she became German champion. She continued to break records, including the women's altitude record in 1957 and her first diamond of the Gold-C badge.

During the mid-1950s, Reitsch was interviewed on film and talked about her wartime flight tests of the Fa 61, Me 262 and Me 163.

In 1959, Indian Prime Minister Jawaharlal Nehru invited Reitsch, who spoke fluent English, to start a gliding centre, and she flew with him over New Delhi.

In 1961, United States President John F. Kennedy invited her to the White House.

From 1962 to 1966, she lived in Ghana. The then Ghanaian President, Kwame Nkrumah invited Reitsch to Ghana after reading of her work in India. At Afienya she founded the first black African national gliding school, working closely with the government and the armed forces. The West German government supported her as technical adviser. The school was commanded by J.E.S. de Graft-Hayford, with gliders such as the double-seated Schleicher K7, Slingsby T.21 and a Bergfalke, along with a single-seated Schleicher K 8. She gained the FAI Diamond Badge in 1970. The project was evidently of great importance to Nkrumah and has been interpreted as part of a "modernist" development ideology.

Reitsch's attitudes to race underwent a change. "Earlier in my life, it would never have occurred to me to treat a black person as a friend or partner ..." She now experienced guilt at her earlier "presumptuousness and arrogance". She became close to Nkrumah. The details of their relationship are now unclear due to the destruction of documents, but some surviving letters are intimate in tone.

In Ghana, some Africans were disturbed by the prominence of a person with Reitsch's past, but Shirley Graham Du Bois, a noted African-American writer who had emigrated to Ghana and was friendly towards Reitsch, agreed with Nkrumah that Reitsch was extremely naive politically. Contemporary Ghanaian press reports seem to show a lack of interest in her past.

Throughout the 1970s, Reitsch broke gliding records in many categories, including the "Women's Out and Return World Record" twice, once in 1976 and again, in 1979, flying along the Appalachian Ridges in the United States. During this time, she also finished first in the women's section of the first world helicopter championships.

Last interview, 1970s
Reitsch was interviewed and photographed several times in the 1970s, towards the end of her life, by Jewish-American photo-journalist Ron Laytner. In her closing remarks she is quoted as saying:

In the same interview, she is quoted as saying,

Death

Reitsch died of a heart attack in Frankfurt at the age of 67, on 24 August 1979. She had never married. She is buried in the Reitsch family grave in the Salzburger Kommunalfriedhof.

Former British test pilot and Royal Navy officer Eric Brown said he received a letter from Reitsch in early August 1979 in which she said, "It began in the bunker, there it shall end." Within weeks she was dead. Brown speculated that Reitsch had taken the cyanide capsule Hitler had given her in the bunker, and that she had taken it as part of a suicide pact with Greim. There is no record of an autopsy.

List of awards and world records

 1932: women's gliding endurance record (5.5 hours)
 1936: women's gliding distance record
 1937: first woman to cross the Alps in a glider
 1937: the first woman in the world to be promoted to flight captain by Colonel Ernst Udet
 1937: the first woman to fly a helicopter (Fa 61)
 1937: world distance record in a helicopter
 1938: the first person to fly a helicopter (Fa 61) inside an enclosed space (Deutschlandhalle)
 1938: winner of German national gliding competition Sylt-Breslau Silesia
 1939: women's world record in gliding for point-to-point flight.
 1943: While in the Luftwaffe, the first woman to pilot a rocket plane (Messerschmitt Me 163). She survived a disastrous crash though with severe injuries and because of this she became the first of three German women to receive the Iron Cross First Class.
 1944: the first woman in the world to pilot a jet aircraft at the Luftwaffe research centre at Rechlin during the trials of the Messerschmitt Me 262 and Heinkel He 162
 1952: third place in the World Gliding Championships in Spain together with her team-mate Lisbeth Häfner
 1955: German gliding champion
 1956: German gliding distance record
 1957: German gliding altitude record

Books by Hanna Reitsch
 . 4th ed. Munich: Herbig, 2001.  (Autobiography)
 . 2nd ed. Munich: Herbig, 1979. .
 . 7th ed. Munich: Herbig, 1992. .
 . Munich: Heyne, 1984. .
 . 2nd expanded ed. Munich/Berlin: Herbig, 1978. .

In popular culture
Reitsch has been portrayed by the following actresses in film and television productions.
 Barbara Rütting in the 1965 film Operation Crossbow
 Diane Cilento in the 1973 British film Hitler: The Last Ten Days.
 Myvanwy Jenn in the 1973 British television production The Death of Adolf Hitler.
 Anna Thalbach in the 2004 German film Downfall.

See also

Rhön-Rossitten Gesellschaft

Notes

References

Citations

Bibliography

Further reading

External links

 
  where she exclaims about Hitler's understanding in avionics: "I was deeply astonished about his interests"
 
  testing the Me 163 jet plane
  as depicted in the Downfall
 The first women astronaut  (Woman Pilot Magazine website)
 

1912 births
1979 deaths
German women aviators
German World War II pilots
German glider pilots
German test pilots
Helicopter pilots
Recipients of the Iron Cross (1939), 1st class
Flight altitude record holders
Flight endurance record holders
Rotorcraft flight record holders
Glider flight record holders
German aviation record holders
German women aviation record holders
German people of Austrian descent
Holocaust denial
People from the Province of Silesia
People from Jelenia Góra